Methylamine is an organic compound with a formula of . This colorless gas is a derivative of ammonia, but with one hydrogen atom being replaced by a methyl group. It is the simplest primary amine.

Methylamine is sold as a solution in methanol, ethanol, tetrahydrofuran, or water, or as the anhydrous gas in pressurized metal containers. Industrially, methylamine is transported in its anhydrous form in pressurized railcars and tank trailers. It has a strong odor similar to rotten fish. Methylamine is used as a building block for the synthesis of numerous other commercially available compounds.

Industrial production 
Methylamine is prepared commercially by the reaction of ammonia with methanol in the presence of an aluminosilicate catalyst. Dimethylamine and trimethylamine are co-produced; the reaction kinetics and reactant ratios determine the ratio of the three products. The product most favored by the reaction kinetics is trimethylamine.

In this way, an estimated 115,000 tons were produced in 2005.

Laboratory methods
Methylamine was first prepared in 1849 by Charles-Adolphe Wurtz via the hydrolysis of methyl isocyanate and related compounds. An example of this process includes the use of the Hofmann rearrangement, to yield methylamine from acetamide and bromine gas.

In the laboratory, methylamine hydrochloride is readily prepared by various other methods. One method entails treating formaldehyde with ammonium chloride.

The colorless hydrochloride salt can be converted to an amine by the addition of a strong base, such as sodium hydroxide (NaOH):

Another method entails reducing nitromethane with zinc and hydrochloric acid.

Another method of methylamine production is spontaneous decarboxylation of glycine with a strong base in water.

Reactivity and applications 
Methylamine is a good nucleophile as it is an unhindered amine. As an amine it is considered a weak base. Its use in organic chemistry is pervasive. Some reactions involving simple reagents include: with phosgene to methyl isocyanate, with carbon disulfide and sodium hydroxide to the sodium methyldithiocarbamate, with chloroform and base to methyl isocyanide and with ethylene oxide to methylethanolamines. Liquid methylamine has solvent properties analogous to those of liquid ammonia.

Representative commercially significant chemicals produced from methylamine include the pharmaceuticals ephedrine and theophylline, the pesticides carbofuran, carbaryl, and metham sodium, and the solvents N-methylformamide and N-methylpyrrolidone. The preparation of some surfactants and photographic developers require methylamine as a building block.

Biological chemistry 
Methylamine arises as a result of putrefaction and is a substrate for methanogenesis.

Additionally, methylamine is produced during PADI4-dependent arginine demethylation.

Safety 
The LD50 (mouse, s.c.) is 2.5 g/kg.

The Occupational Safety and Health Administration (OSHA) and National Institute for Occupational Safety and Health (NIOSH) have set occupational exposure limits at 10 ppm or 12 mg/m3 over an eight-hour time-weighted average.

Regulation 
In the United States, methylamine is controlled as a List 1 precursor chemical by the Drug Enforcement Administration due to its use in the illicit production of methamphetamine.

In popular culture 
Fictional characters Walter White and Jesse Pinkman use methylamine as part of a process to synthesize methamphetamine in the AMC series Breaking Bad.

See also
Methylammonium halide

References 

Alkylamines
1849 introductions
Organic compounds with 1 carbon atom